Giovani Luiz Neitzke or simply Giovani (born February 28, 1989) is a goalkeeper player from Brazil. His brother André Luís Neitzke is also footballer.

Playing career
Giovani came through the youth team at Grêmio and SER Caxias. He joined top team of Grêmio in 2007. In September, he moved to J2 League club, Cerezo Osaka. His brother André Luís Neitzke also played for the club in 2006.

References
Giovani at playmakerstats.com (English version of ogol.com.br)

1989 births
Living people
Brazilian footballers
Brazilian expatriate footballers
Grêmio Foot-Ball Porto Alegrense players
Cerezo Osaka players
J2 League players
Expatriate footballers in Japan
Brazilian people of German descent
Association football midfielders